The Foumban Royal Palace is a historical building in the city of Foumban, capital of Noun. It is the seat of the Kingdom of Bamum, where the Chief-Superior of the peoples of the valley of the East bank of the Noun resides.

The royal palace of Foumban, where the king of the Bamum still resides today, was built in 1917. The Palace Museum tells the history of the dynasty of the Bamum kings from 1394 to the present day, with information on the most famous of the Bamum kings, Ibrahim Njoya, who died in 1933 and who created a writing system at the end of the 19th century called Bamum script.

Bibliography 
 Christraud M. Geary, The Things of the Palace: Catalog of the Bamoum Palace Museum in Foumban, Franz Steiner Verlag GMBH, Wiesbaden, 1984
 Adamou Ndam Njoya, The palace of Foumban: a masterpiece of art and architecture, Editions Ndam and Raynier, Yaounde, Foumban, 1975, 48 p.

See also 
 Kingdom of Bamum
 Foumban
 Bamum people
 Ibrahim Njoya
 Bamum language

References

External links
http://aflit.arts.uwa.edu.au/IneditAssigaAhanda.html

Historic sites in Cameroon
Royal residences
Residential buildings in Cameroon
Palaces in Africa
Museums in Cameroon
Historic house museums in Africa
Biographical museums in Africa
West Region (Cameroon)